Jennifer Charles (born Jennifer Asher Zipken; November 15, 1968) is an American singer, songwriter, poet, writer, and actor. Along with Oren Bloedow, she co-founded the New York band Elysian Fields. Her work is known for its emotional intensity, with her writing exploring nature, love, loss, death, myth, and identity, often with philosophical and literary influences. She has a contralto voice.

Early life
Jennifer was the first born child of Peter Charles (né Zipken) and Jeri Charles (née Valentine). She has a younger brother, Joshua. When Jennifer was an infant, her father had her birth name (and that of the whole family) changed from Zipken to Charles, which had been his professional name for years on the radio as a disc jockey, and which he had decided to change legally once his own father died. Charles is of Russian Jewish and Irish descent, and grew up in a mostly secular Jewish household. Her parents separated when she was four, and Jennifer and her brother were raised by their mother, seeing her father every two weeks. She grew up in houses filled with music, because her mother had been a classical music programmer at WMAL-FM, and because her father had been a late night jazz DJ at WAVZ out of New Haven, CT. Her mother also used to be a torch singer in Washington clubs, so Jennifer also learned early on the songs of Édith Piaf, Ruth Etting, Marlene Dietrich, Billie Holiday, and Judy Garland. And from her grandmother, she absorbed most of the Tin Pan Alley and blues songs of the 1920s and 1930s. The music of popular AM radio at the time of her childhood was multiform, and Jennifer fell asleep with a transistor radio most nights.

The homes Jennifer grew up in with her mother in Washington, D.C. were unconventional, and she was exposed to many cultures as her mother and her mother's good friend (another single mother) formed something of a group house, taking in writers and filmmakers (Stephen Jimenez and Henry Jaglom among them), and a French chef as boarders. As young children, she and her brothers would travel door to door, performing a kind of children's vaudeville act, singing Tin Pan Alley songs and tap dancing. Jennifer was a shy girl, so when she started doing children's theater at age 10, her stage debut at Trinity Theater was that of a cat who had no speaking lines but was a mime and dancer who was onstage the length of the play. It was an original role that the director let Jennifer create as she felt she did not fit into any of the written parts. She was also writing herself, and published her first poem, called "Riddle-Song Of The Sun," that same year. At age 11, she started a newspaper with her best friend called The Pre-Teen Times where they sold subscriptions that came out quarterly. At age 12, she became passionate about the music of South Asia after her mother returned from a journey across India and Nepal with a bag full of cassettes for her, with Jagjit and Chitra Singh's The Gold Disc being her favorite. She took flamenco lessons as a young teen, and continued to do children's theater and community theater. She studied acting for a summer at Catholic University, and had principal roles in productions at Little Theatre of Alexandria, Olney Theatre Center, and Folger Shakespeare Theatre. She attended the Washington International School, where she studied Spanish and Latin, then the Edmund Burke School, a college prep school she left after she had begun working in professional theatre at Studio Theatre and Source Theatre, and the school could not accommodate her rehearsal schedule. For her last two years of high school, Jennifer attended Duke Ellington School of the Arts, where she was a theater major. An advanced academic program also landed her part-time at George Washington University, where she studied writing and anthropology. 

Jennifer's youth in the melting pot of Washington, D.C. was instrumental in her music influence and taste. Her mother had season tickets to the National Symphony Orchestra, which they attended on Friday nights, and her father would take her to hear live jazz at places like Blues Alley, One Step Down, and Charlie's Georgetown, where she saw the likes of Anita O'Day, Mel Tormé, Dizzy Gillespie, Ahmad Jamal, Oscar Peterson, George Shearing, and Jamaican jazz pianist Monty Alexander. In her teens, Jennifer would often travel to New York and London, both with friends and on her own. She was turned on to the different sounds in each city - The Lounge Lizards, Diamanda Galas, Lydia Lunch, Blondie, and The Velvet Underground in New York; and The Specials, Gang of Four, Siouxsie, The Slits, The Buzzcocks, The Birthday Party, Cocteau Twins, and The Fall in the UK. But she was also steeped in the contemporary scenes of her own hometown, dancing at Tracks, Poseurs, and Badlands, and frequenting live music venues like D.C. Space, 9:30 Club, Fort Reno Park, and Cafe Lautrec to see punk bands like Bad Brains, Beefeater, and Rites of Spring. She also grew up going to go-go concerts, seeing Chuck Brown, Trouble Funk, Junk Yard Band, E.U., and Rare Essence, and went to hear Ethiopian music in the clubs and restaurants of DC's Adams Morgan neighborhood. As a junior in high school, Jennifer moved out on her own and supported herself with theater work and various odd jobs, including as an artist model at the Corcoran School of the Arts and as a singing waitress in a piano bar called The Top Hat Club.

Career
In 1987, she moved to New York to continue her theatre and academic studies, receiving her Bachelor of Fine Arts from NYU's Tisch school in just three years. Upon graduating she appeared in various off-broadway theater productions, had a stint singing in a dive piano bar and curated a performance/poetry series at the original Knitting Factory.

Elysian Fields was founded in 1995 and have released eleven full-length records (including one produced by Steve Albini that was shelved). They have also contributed to many compilation albums, including the first song on John Zorn's Serge Gainsbourg tribute album. This song, their rendition of "Les Amours Perdues", also appeared in Lea Pool's film Emporte Moi.

Besides Elysian Fields, Charles has other projects. She and Bloedow recorded La Mar Enfortuna for Zorn's Tzadik label, featuring renditions of Sephardic and Ladino songs. She has studied classical Indian singing with teacher Gulamji. 

In late 2007, she and Bloedow put out a second Tzadik full-length, under the band name La Mar Enfortuna, called "Conviviencia". Charles sings in five languages on the record, including Ladino, Spanish, Aramaic, Arabic, and Greek.

Charles also makes up a quarter of the band Lovage, along with Dan the Automator, Mike Patton and Kid Koala. The band recorded its debut album titled Music to Make Love to Your Old Lady By in 2001. Charles co-wrote and sang most of the material on the album. She has also worked with bands like Firewater, turning in performances on "The Circus" and "Mr. Cardiac" from 1996's Get Off the Cross, We Need the Wood for the Fire, as well as Xian Hawkin's "Sybarite", the Foetus record, Love, as well as working with Matt Johnson of The The, and on several of John Zorn's records.

Charles recorded in French with the French composer Jean-Louis Murat for the album A bird on a poire in 2004, which was nominated for a Victoires de la Musique award in the category Best Pop or Rock Album.

She had a guest spot on ex-Nine Inch Nails drummer Chris Vrenna's solo project Tweaker. She sang and co-composed the track "Crude Sunlight", which appeared on the 2004 album 2 a.m. Wakeup Call. Charles co-composed music with Johnny Klimek and Reinhold Heil (Run Lola Run) for the film Tangled. Elysian Fields' version of Bob Dylan's "Tangled up in Blue" can be heard in the film's credits.

She produced the latest Oren Bloedow solo record She Goes With me to a Blossom World, which came out in 2008.

Charles was back on stage in 2008 in the Off Broadway production "Lightning at Our Feet", inspired by poet Emily Dickinson, under the direction of Obie winner Bob McGrath, with film maker Bill Morrison and composer Michael Gordon, which was part of the Next Wave festival at Brooklyn Academy of Music in December 2008, where she sang and acted, channeling the iconic 19th century poet.

Discography
2023:  Wax Tailor – "Shaman In Your Arms" (in album "Fishing For Accidents", Lab'oratoire, FR) vocalist
2020:  Elysian Fields – Transience Of Life (Microcultures, France; Ojet, US) writer, vocalist
2020:  Various Artists – Angelheaded Hipster: The Songs of Marc Bolan & T. Rex (BMG, US) vocalist
2020:  Bebel Gilberto – Agora (Pias America) writer, bgvs 
2020:  Elysian Fields – "When We Used To" (Ojet, US) writer, vocalist
2020:  Elysian Fields – "Shelter In Place" (Ojet, US) writer, vocalist
2019:  Elysian Fields – "Song For A Nun" b/w "Ball Drive" 7-inch (Ojet, US) writer, vocalist
2018:  Various Artists – Vanity Of Vanities - A Tribute To Connie Converse (Tzadik, US) vocalist
2018:  Elysian Fields – Pink Air (Microcultures, FR; Ojet, US) writer, vocalist
2017:  Du Yun, Royce Vavrek – Angel's Bone (VIA Records, US) vocalist
2017:  The The – Radio Cinéola Trilogy (Lazarus, UK) vocalist
2017:  Nathaniel Merriweather – "Summer Lovin'" (Amazon Music, US) writer, vocalist
2016:  Elysian Fields – Ghosts of No (Vicious Circle, France; Ojet, US) writer, vocalist
2016:  Tredici Bacci – Amore Per Tutti (NNA Tapes) writer, vocalist
2014:  Elysian Fields – For House Cats and Sea Fans (Vicious Circle, France; Diluvian/Ojet, US) writer, vocalist
2012:  Wax Tailor – "Heart Stop" (Le Plan, Lab'oratoire, FR) vocalist
2011:  Elysian Fields – Last Night on Earth (Vicious Circle Records, FR; Ojet, US) writer, vocalist
2009:  Elysian Fields – The Afterlife (Diluvian/Vicious Circle) writer, vocalist, rebab
2008:  The Heavy Circles – S/T (Dynamite Child) bgvs
2008:  Oren Bloedow – She Goes With Me to a Blossom World (Diluvian) producer, bgvs, keyboards
2007:  La Mar Enfortuna – Convivencia (Tzadik) voc, writer
2007:  Foetus – Vein (Birdman) vocalist
2006:  Ben Perowsky's Moodswing Orchestra – S/T (El Destructo) writer, vocalist
2006:  Elysian Fields – Bum Raps And Love Taps (Diluvian/Naive) writer, vocalist, keyboards
2005:  Foetus – Love (Birdman Records) vocalist
2004:  Jean-Louis Murat – A Bird on a Poire (Labels) vocalist
2004:  Elysian Fields – Dreams That Breathe Your Name (Diluvian) writer, vocalist, farfisa
2004:  Tweaker – 2 AM Wake-Up Call (IMUSIC) writer, vocalist
2003:  Ben Perowsky – Camp Songs (Tzadik) vocalist
2003:  Sasha Argov – Great Jewish Music (Tzadik) vocalist
2003:  Foetus – A Tribute to the Sisters of Mercy (EFA) vocalist, writer
2002:  Frank London – Scientist at Work (Tzadik) vocalist
2002:  John Zorn – Film Works XII – Three Documentaries (Tzadik) vocalist
2002:  Sybarite – Scene of the Crime (4AD) writer, vocalist
2002:  John Zorn – IAO Music in Sacred Light (Tzadik) vocalist
2001:  illy B Eats – Drop the Needle (Amulet) writer, vocalist
2001:  Zoar – Clouds Without Water (vocalist)
2001:  Lovage – Music to Make Love to Your Old Lady By (75 Ark) writer, vocalist
2001:  Firewater Psychopharmachology (Jetset) vocalist
2001:  Oren Bloedow and Jennifer Charles – La Mar Enfortuna (Tzadik) vocalist, bells, wurli, writer
2000:  Elysian Fields – Queen of the Meadow (Jetset) writer, vocalist, mini moog, guitar, wurli
1999:  Liminal (unreleased) writer, vocalist
1999:  What's the Word Volume 1 – Various Artists (Deezal) writer, vocalist, piano
1999:  DJ Logic – Project Logic (Ropeadope) writer, vocalist
1999:  Jean Louis Murat – Mustango (Labels) vocalist
1998:  Great Jewish Music: Marc Bolan – Various Artists (Tzadik) vocalist
1998:  Elysian Fields – Clinical Trial (Radioactive - unreleased) writer, vocalist
1998:  Oren Bloedow – The Luckiest Boy in the World, Knitting Factory Works (bgv)
1997:  Elysian Fields Meets DJ Cam (Radioactive) writer, vocalist
1997:  Great Jewish Music: Serge Gainsbourg Various Artists (Tzadik) vocalist
1997:  Life in a Blender – Two Legs Bad (Fang) phoned in whispers
1997:  Live – Secret Samadhi (Radioactive) bgvs
1996:  Jennifer and Kenny Siegel Sessions (unreleased) vocalist
1996:  Firewater - Get Off The Cross ... We Need The Wood for the Fire (Jetset) vocalist
1996:  Elysian Fields – Bleed Your Cedar (Radioactive) writer, vocalist, rhythm king, percussion
1996:  Elysian Fields – Elysian Fields EP (Radioactive) writer, vocalist
1992:  Oren Bloedow – S/T (Knitting Factory Works) bgvs

References

External links
 Elysian Fields Website
Jennifer Charles interviewed on Jekyll and Hyde, 106FM Jerusalem 2010
An Interview With Jennifer Charles of Elysian Fields by Florenz Cruz of WFMU

1968 births
Living people
American women singer-songwriters
American rock songwriters
American women rock singers
Arabic-language singers
Aramaic-language singers
Spanish-language singers of the United States
Judaeo-Spanish-language singers
French-language singers of the United States
Tisch School of the Arts alumni
Torch singers
Singers from New York City
Lovage (band) members
Singer-songwriters from New York (state)
Singer-songwriters from Washington, D.C.